8 à Huit is a chain of supermarkets and convenience stores based in France. Founded in 1977, the company has been a subsidiary of the French supermarket chain Carrefour since 1999.  As the name implies, stores are typically open from 8:00 A.M. to 8:00 P.M. local time.

See also

 List of convenience stores

References

External links

Carrefour
Convenience stores
Supermarkets of France
Retail companies established in 1977
1977 establishments in France